Vardan Martun Ghazaryan (born 1 December 1969) is a football coach and former player.

Born in Armenia, Ghazaryan moved to Lebanon and obtained citizenship through naturalisation in 1994. He played for Homenetmen and Sagesse as a striker, and represented Lebanon internationally from 1995 until 2001.

Ghazaryan is the second-highest all-time scorer in the Lebanese Premier League, scoring 117 official league goals. He is also the joint-top scorer for the national team with 21 goals, alongside Hassan Maatouk. In 2017, Ghazaryan was appointed manager of Tripoli for one year. He returned as Sagesse coach in 2021.

Club career 
Ghazaryan started his senior career in 1989 in Armenia, at Spartak Hoktemberyan, before moving to Kapan in 1990. In 1992 he moved to Lebanon, joining Homenetmen Beirut. He stayed there for seven years, before moving to Sagesse in 1999. He spent three years there, before moving back to Homenetmen in 2002. Ghazaryan then joined Sagesse once again, in 2005, before retiring in 2009 aged 39.

His first goal in the Lebanese Premier League came on 23 January 1993, when he scored the second goal for Homenetmen against Tadamon Sour in the 54th minute. Ghazaryan was named AFC Player of the Month for January 1996.

On 16 November 2008, at 39 years old, Ghazaryan scored his 129th goal in the Lebanese Premier League against Tadamon Sour, becoming the highest all-time scorer in the league. However, some do not recognise the 12 goals he scored in the 2000–01 season, which was canceled, making him the second-highest top-goalscorer with 117 goals, behind Fadi Alloush's total of 120.

International career 
Having moved to Lebanon from Armenia, Ghazaryan obtained Lebanese citizenship through naturalisation in 1994. He is the joint-leading goal scorer in the history of the Lebanon national team, with 21 goals (four in World Cup qualifiers, three in Asian Cup qualifiers and 14 in friendlies).

Managerial career
In 2009, Ghazaryan returned to his native Armenia where he trained an Armenian club; he moved back to Lebanon four years later. Ghazaryan became the assistant coach for Tripoli, before being appointed head coach in 2017.

In July 2021, ahead of the 2021 Lebanese Challenge Cup, Ghazaryan was appointed head coach of Lebanese Premier League side Sagesse, for whom he had already played as a player.

Career statistics

International

 Scores and results list Lebanon's goal tally first, score column indicates score after each Ghazaryan goal.

Honours

Player 
Syunik Kapan
 Armenian SSR League: 1991

Homenetmen
 Lebanese Second Division: 2002–03

Individual
 IFFHS All-time Lebanon Men's Dream Team
 AFC Player of the Month: January 1996
 Lebanese Premier League Best Player: 1996–97
 Lebanese Premier League Team of the Season: 1996–97, 1999–2000

Records
 Lebanon all-time top goalscorer: 21 goals

See also
 List of Lebanon international footballers
 List of Lebanon international footballers born outside Lebanon
 List of top international men's football goal scorers by country

Notes

References

External links

 
 Vardan Ghazaryan at RSSSF
 
 
 

1969 births
Living people
People from Kapan
Soviet Armenians
Soviet footballers
Lebanese footballers
Lebanese football managers
Lebanon international footballers
Armenian footballers
Armenian football managers
Armenian emigrants to Lebanon
Naturalized citizens of Lebanon
Association football forwards
FC Armavir (Armenia) players
FC Lernagorts Kapan players
Homenetmen Beirut footballers
Sagesse SC footballers
Armenian Premier League players
Lebanese Premier League players
Lebanese Second Division players
Asian Games competitors for Lebanon
Footballers at the 1998 Asian Games
2000 AFC Asian Cup players
AC Tripoli managers
Sagesse SC football managers
Lebanese Premier League managers
Association football coaches